Manonmani is a 1942 Indian Tamil-language film directed by T. R. Sundaram.  It starred P. U. Chinnappa, T. R. Rajakumari, Serukalathur Sama, T. S. Balaiah, T. R. Mahalingam, K. K. Perumal, A. Sakunthala, N. S. Krishnan, T. A. Madhuram, Kali N. Ratnam, L. Narayana Rao, S. S. Kokko, C. T. Rajakantham, P. R. Mangalam, P. G. Venkatesan, T. R. B. Rao, M. E. Madhavan, "Buffoon" Shanmugham, J. M. G. Sarada and G. Saraswathi. It is based on the 1892 play Manonmaneeyam by Sundaram Pillai. The film ran more than 25 weeks.

Plot 
King Seevaka of Pandya Kingdom ruled the Kingdom through its capital Madurai. But, under the bad influence of the minister, Kutilan (Balasubramaniam) he changed his capital to Tirunelveli where Kutilan has support. Kutilan wants to rule the kingdom. So, he tried to make the king fall. Rajaguru (Sama) told the king that the capital is not so strong. He said that he would make the Kingdom good with doing a yagna and want to have a special room for him. Princess Manonmani, who dreamt of Chera King Purushottaman fell in love with him as he also does. But, Kutilan wants Manonmani to marry Baladeva his son. Soon, the Rajaguru who was good hearted wanted the princess to marry Purushottaman to get out of  Kutilan's evil trap. He asked Seevaka and Manonmani to come to a secret pathway under the palace connecting to the Rajaguru's ashram and Chera's Army Place. Seevaka told this to Kutilan. But,

Manonmani, the Pandya princess (Rajakumari), falls in love in her dream with a prince Purushottaman (Chinnappa) who too does likewise with each unaware of the other's identity! But their love grows deeper in their hearts. The Rajaguru (Sama) is keen on bringing the two kingdoms together and builds a ‘secret way' from one kingdom to the other. However, the King (Perumal) is under the influence of the scheming minister Kutilan, (Balasubramaniam, the name was obviously inspired by the celebrated Kautilya, Chanakya.) The minister's son Balaiah has an eye on the princess, and the father and son try to manipulate the king's mind…

After many twists, the lovers meet and the two kingdoms come together and the ‘dream lovers' marry….  An interesting tale of kings, princes and princesses, Rajaguru and evil ministers, Manonmani was a box office hit with Rajakumari and Chinnappa stealing the show. Sakunthala (Mrs. Chinnappa in private life) played the princess's companion, while the ‘comedy track' was taken care of by the inimitable Krishnan-Mathuram supported by Narayana Rao.

Cast 

 P. U. Chinnappa as 'Chera King' Puruchothaman
 T. R. Rajakumari as Manonmani
 T. S. Balaiah as Palathevan
 T. R. Mahalingam as Natarajan
 N. S. Krishnan as Pani Pandaram
 T. A. Madhuram as
 N. Kali Rathnam as Suba
 R. Balasubramaniam as Kudilan
 Serukalathur Sama as The Rajaguru
 Kottapuli Jayaraman as The lender
 Pulimootai Ramasamy as Saint
 L. Narayana Rao
 S. S. Kokko (Pasupuleti Srinivasulu Naidu)
 C. T. Rajakantham
 P. R. Mangalam
 P. G. Venkatesan
 T. R. B. Rao
 M. E. Madhavan
 "Buffoon" Shanmugham
 J. M. G. Sarada
 G. Saraswathi

Soundtrack 
The music was composed by T. A. Kalyanam assisted by K. V. Mahadevan and the lyrics were penned by Papanasam Rajagopala Iyer

Reception
Kalki in their review appreciated the performances of the cast.

References 

1940s Tamil-language films
1942 films
Films directed by T. R. Sundaram
Films scored by T. A. Kalyanam
Indian black-and-white films
Indian films based on plays